The Hijama, also known as cupping are an ethnic group in India known for practicing cupping therapy. The word Hijama has been derived from the Arabic word , means "sucking", referring to this therapy. A practitioner was called a Hijama in Arab countries, and the name was used in India as well.

Communities of Arab campaigned in Persia, Egypt to propagate the message of Islam during the Caliphate power of some companions of Muhammad. Then the Persians ran to conquer India. In this way, Hijama came from Arab to Persia, and then to India. In India, they practiced their occupation and included multi practices with Hijama like pulling of teeth, hairdressing, sheep shearing, treating of abscesses, etc. Because of different multi practices besides Hijama, they were named Hijama as they were already called in their original countries. They are now an ethnic group found in North India and Pakistan. In Pakistan, they are established in Sindh and Punjab provinces. They are deemed underdeveloped communities in India, but in North India. They are also found in the provinces of Sindh and Punjab in Pakistan. They are also known as the Khalifa in Uttar Pradesh as the Salmani. Satat of  West Bengal known as khalifa a

Types of Hijama

There are broadly two types of Hijamah: hijamat-bil-shurt and hijamat-bilashurt

 Wet cupping (Hijamat-bil-shurt): Cupping with scarification from the letting of blood, i.e., a glass cup is applied to the skin and a partial vacuum is created inside the cup. After a few minutes, a few superficial incisions are made to the skin, and bloodletting is induced through replacement of the cup with a vacuum. Hijamat-bil-shurt works on the principle of tanqiya-e-mavad, i.e. evacuation of morbid matters from the affected area.
 Dry cupping (Hijamat-bila-shurt): Cupping without bloodletting, i.e., cups are placed without making incisions or pricks on the skin of the affected area. The vacuum is created either by suction or by using fire. Hijamat-bila-shurt works on the principle of imala-e-mavaad, which is the diversion of morbid tumors from one site to another (Ibn Sina, 1995; Baghdadi, 2005; Kabiruddin, 1955).

History

Hijama is an ancient practice used by all nations including Arabs, Persia, Babylons, Chinese, Pharaohs, Egyptians, Asians, Greece and throughout Europe where it was widely used as traditional medicine around the world and is still used by modern practitioners around the world.

The practice of Hijama in Islam was made popular by Muhammad. As per the sunnah, it is known that he has said,

"Healing is in three things: A gulp of honey, cupping, and branding with fire (cauterizing)." But I forbid my followers to use (cauterization) branding with fire."

Historic Benefits of Hijama 
Muhammad had used cupping for different medical needs. It was reported that he once used cupping for migraines. As narrated by Ibn `Abbas, Muhammad was cupped on his head for an ailment he was suffering from while he was in a state of Ihram. at a water place called Lahl Jamal. Ibn `Abbas further said: Allah s Apostle was cupped on his head for unilateral headache while he was in a state of Ihram.

The best and most beneficial days to have hijama performed, also commonly known as the 'Sunnah Days' are the 17th, 19th or 21st of the Islamic (Lunar) month which fall on a Monday, Tuesday or Thursday. Taking into consideration that in Islam the night enters before the day.

Jabir narrated that Muhammad was treated with cupping on his hip because of a sprain or bruise. (Sunan Abu Dawud 3863)

Present circumstances

Salmani in India 
The Hijama have largely been dependent on their labor and services, although some have acquired agricultural land and engaged in settled agriculture, besides being barbers occupationally. Many have also taken to education or started there petty businessmen. The community considers itself as Shaikh. This transformation in their social status has also seen in the dropping of the word Hijama, so they now self-identify as Salmani. They are mainly found in the states of Uttar Pradesh, Bihar and Jammu, and Kashmir. The Hijama community consists of a number of clans, known as biradaris. Traditionally, marriages occur within the biradris. Their main biradaris are Behlim and Deswal Khalifa of Muzaffarnagar District, Turkiya of Rohilkhand, the Shaikh Salmani, Turkiya, and Pirzada in Awadh.  West Bengal Purulia district asta/osta baradari have  Two Big Village Dubra and Bamunbad

Each of their settlement contains a community that has a community council, which acts as an instrument of social control. This community council is responsible for imposing fines for the offense of disrespecting traditional norms and for resolving minor disputes within the community. The community is known as Sunni Hanafi Muslims, and are considered fairly orthodox. They are also an endogamous community, preferring to marry among themselves. Cross - cousin marriages are preferred.

In Bihar, the Hajjam are generally known as Khalifas, and they speak Maithili, a dialect of Hindi. Most of the educated Hajjam also speak Urdu language. They are found throughout Bihar, and are still engaged in their occupation. However, many Khalifa in Jharkhand are now farmers. The community has a biradari panchayat, which deals with intracommunity disputes as well as a representative to the state. Many have also emigrated to Mumbai and Kolkata, where they are employed as day laborers.

In Pakistan
In Pakistan, the Hajjam are found predominantly in the Punjab province. The Muslim Hajjam has three sub-divisions, the Bahalim Chauhan, and Kharal. The first claims descent from Yemeni Arab, the other two were originally Muslim Rajputs. They are also other sub-groups, such as the Banbheru, Ghaghrel and Turkman. In addition, many Hijama claim to have been of Bhatti, Khokhar, Awan origin, who due to circumstances have taken up the occupation of being barbers. Many Hijamas from Uttar Pradesh in India migrated to Pakistan after independence in 1947 and mainly settled in Karachi.

Kisbatnama
They maintain a manual of their art, known as the Kisbatnama. In this, it is said that God first ordered Archangel Gabriel to shave Adam. Thus Adam learned the art of shaving and handed down the art to Solomon.

Notable People
 Jawed Habib, Indian Politician,Hairstylist and Businessman
Oualud El Hajjam, Moroccan Footballer 
Aalim Hakeem, Bollywood Hairstylist
Nazir Ali, British Hairstylist

References

Social groups of Pakistan
Punjabi tribes
Sindhi tribes
Muslim communities of India
Social groups of Haryana
Muslim communities of Bihar
Social groups of Bihar
Social groups of Uttar Pradesh
Social groups of Punjab, Pakistan
Muslim communities of Uttar Pradesh